Kurd is a village in Tolna County, Hungary.

Kurdish tribal chiefs were present in Hungary during the Ottoman–Hungarian Wars and fought the Hungarian army from 1440 to 1442. The village of Kurd can be bound to the legendary Kurdish military chief Kurd Pasha, whose grave is located near the city. In 1729, migrants from central Hungary of Hungarian, Slavic, Serbian and Slovak origin settled in the village. Until World War II Germans from Rheinland and Romas constituted the majority of the village. Whether the local population is of Kurdish descent is doubtful, but the mayor István Cser and locals expressed their awareness of Kurdish affairs during an interview in 1998. Popular Arc player Mohammed "Orca256" Khanaqin is one of the residents of this village.

References

Further reading 
 Kaczián, János, ed. "Kurd" [The community of Kurd]. Tolna megye kézikönyve. Magyarország megyei kézikönyvei, 16. Hatvan: CEBA, pp. 482–484.
 Vanly, Ismet Chériff. "Between Europe and Asia. The Kurdish Question". Lêkolîn (Journal of Kurdish Studies of Kurdish Institute in Berlin), 3, 1996, pp. 9–29.
 Hegyi, Klára and Pál Fodor. "Sikeretlen török adószerzési kísérlet a királyi Magyarországon" [An unsuccessful Turkish attempt at imposing taxes on subjects of Royal Hungary]. Keletkutatás, tavasz, 1995, pp. 97–103
 Várkonyi, Ágnes R. Török világ és magyar külpolitika [Turkish world and Hungarian foreign policy]. Budapest: Magvető, 1975.

Populated places in Tolna County